The Statute of Winchester of 1285 (13 Edw. I, St. 2;), also known as the Statute of Winton, was a statute enacted by King Edward I of England that reformed the system of Watch and Ward (watchmen) of the Assize of Arms of 1252, and revived the jurisdiction of the local courts. It received royal assent on 8 October 1285.

It was the primary legislation enacted to regulate the policing of the country between the Norman Conquest and the Metropolitan Police Act 1829. Of particular note was the requirement to raise hue and cry, and that "the whole hundred … shall be answerable" for any theft or robbery, in effect a form of collective responsibility.

Chapters
The Statute of Winchester is composed of six chapters:

See also 

 History of law enforcement in the United Kingdom

References

External links
 

1285 in England
1280s in law
1285 works
Acts of the Parliament of England
History of Winchester
Medieval English law
Edward I of England